DE9 | Transitions is a 2005 compilation album by Canadian electronic music artist Richie Hawtin. It contains a CD and a special edition DVD.

Track listing
The CD includes tracks 1-21. The DVD has all 28 tracks.

Charts

References

External links
 
 

2005 albums
2005 video albums
Richie Hawtin albums
Novamute Records albums
Video albums by Canadian artists